An arts council is a government or private non-profit organization dedicated to promoting the arts; mainly by funding local artists, awarding prizes, and organizing arts events. They often operate at arms-length from the government to prevent political interference in their decisions.

List of arts councils

The International Federation of Arts Councils and Culture Agencies (IFACCA) maintains a list of national arts councils on its website.

North America

Canada 
Canada Council
Provincial
British Columbia Arts Council
Alberta Foundation for the Arts
Saskatchewan Arts Board
Manitoba Arts Council
Ontario Arts Council
Conseil des arts et des lettres du Québec
Prince Edward Island Council of the Arts
Municipal
Council for the Arts in Ottawa
Kingston Arts Council
Sudbury Arts Council
Arts Council~Haliburton Highlands
Spruce Grove Allied Arts Council

United States 
National Endowment for the Arts (NEA)
Regional councils
Southeast Southern Arts Federation
Mid-Atlantic Mid Atlantic Arts Foundation
Northeast New England Foundation for the Arts
Mid-America Mid-America Arts Alliance
Mid-West Arts Midwest
West Western States Arts Federation

States

California 
California Arts Council (CAC)
Alameda County: Alameda County Arts Commission
City of Alameda: Alameda Arts Council (AAC)
Amador County: Amador County Arts Council (ACAC)
Calaveras County: Calaveras County Arts Council
Contra Costa County: Arts and Culture Commission of Contra Costa County
El Dorado County: El Dorado Arts Council (EDAC)
Humboldt County: Humboldt Arts Council (HAC)
Inyo County: Inyo Council for the Arts
Lake County: Lake County Arts Council
Los Angeles County: LA County Arts Commission
City of Los Angeles: City of Los Angeles Cultural Affairs Department
Madera County: Madera County Arts Council
Marin County: Marin Arts Council
Mariposa County: Mariposa County Arts Council
Mendocino County: Arts Council of Mendocino County (ACMC)
Merced County: Merced County Arts Council (MCAC)
Modoc County: Modoc County Arts Council
Monterey County: Arts Council for Monterey County (ACMC)
Napa County: Arts Council of Napa Valley (ACNV)
Nevada County: Nevada County Arts Council (NCAC)
Orange County: Arts Orange County (AOC)
Placer County: Arts Council of Placer County (PlacerArts)
Riverside County: Riverside Arts Council (RAC)
Sacramento County: Sacramento Metropolitan Arts Commission (SMAC)
San Bernardino County: Arts Council for San Bernardino County (Arts Connection)
San Diego County: City of San Diego Commission for Arts and Culture
San Francisco County: San Francisco Arts Commission (SFAC)
San Luis Obispo County: San Luis Obispo County Arts Council
Santa Barbara County: Santa Barbara County Arts Commission
Santa Clara County: Arts Council Silicon Valley
Shasta County: Shasta County Arts Council (SCAC)
Siskiyou County: Siskiyou Arts Council
Solano County: Solano County Arts Council
Sonoma County: Cultural Arts Council of Sonoma County
Sutter County: Yuba-Sutter Regional Arts Council (YSRAC)
Tulare County: Arts Council of Tulare County
Tuolumne County: Central Sierra Arts Council
Ventura County: Ventura County Arts Council
Yolo County: Yolo County Arts Council (YCAC)
Yuba County: Yuba-Sutter Regional Arts Council (YSRAC)

Florida 
Florida Keys Council of the Arts

Minnesota 
Minneapolis Arts Commission

New York 
 New York State Council on the Arts
 Bronx County: Bronx Council on the Arts
 Queens County: Queens Council on the Arts
 Sullivan County: Delaware Valley Arts Alliance

North Carolina 
Hillsborough Arts Council
Arts Council of Winston-Salem and Forsyth County
The United Arts Council of Raleigh and Wake County
Durham Arts Council

Oregon 
Oregon Arts Commission

Arts Council of Lake Oswego

Pennsylvania 
Pennsylvania Council on the Arts

Utah 

Utah Arts Council

Europe

Bulgaria 
National Culture Fund of Bulgaria

Germany 
Akademie der Künste
Kulturstiftung des Bundes

Ireland 
Arts Council of Ireland

Italy 
Italian Council

Isle of Man 
Isle of Man Arts Council

Malta 
Arts Council Malta

Norway 
Norsk Kulturråd

Sweden 
 Swedish Arts Council

United Kingdom 
Arts Council of Great Britain - broken up in 1994 into the following three:
Arts Council England
Scottish Arts Council
Arts Council of Wales
Arts Council of Northern Ireland
Cayman National Cultural Foundation, Cayman Islands

Asia

India 
Indira Gandhi National Centre for the Arts

Pakistan 
Arts Council of Pakistan Karachi
Pakistan National Council of the Arts

Philippines 
National Commission for Culture and the Arts

Singapore 
National Arts Council (Singapore)

Africa 
Bomas of Kenya
Baraza la Sanaa la Taifa, Tanzania
National Arts Council of Zimbabwe

Oceania 
Australia Council for the Arts
Regional Arts Australia
Creative New Zealand

References

Further reading

 
Cultural policy